George Economou (September 24, 1934 – May 3, 2019) was an American poet and translator.

Life
George Economou was born on September 24, 1934, in Great Falls, Montana, to Amelia Ananiadis Economou and Demetrios George Economou, both of whom emigrated to the United States from Greece. His father was a businessman and rancher. After primary and secondary school education in Great Falls, he attended Colgate University, where he majored in English and graduated cum laude and was elected to Phi Beta Kappa in 1956. He earned an M.A. in English Literature at Columbia University in 1957 and a Ph.D. in English and Comparative Literature in 1967, specializing in Old and Middle English and continental literature. He taught for 41 years at the Brooklyn Center of Long Island University (1961–83) and at the University of Oklahoma (1983–2000), where he served as Chair of the Department of English (1983–1990) and Director of Creative Writing (1990–2000). He was a founding editor of "The Chelsea Review" (1957–60) and co-founding editor of "Trobar" and Trobar Books (1960–64) with Robert Kelly (poet).

He has published many books of poetry, translations, and scholarly criticism, and his work has appeared in many literary magazines and scholarly journals. He has lectured and given poetry readings at many universities and literary venues throughout the United States and abroad.

He married poet and playwright Rochelle Owens, June 17, 1962. They lived in Philadelphia and Wellfleet, Massachusetts. Mr. Economou died May 3, 2019 in Philadelphia.

His primary archive and papers are held at the Columbia University Rare Book and Manuscript Library. Smaller collections are held at the University of Michigan, Ann Arbor, and Princeton University.

Awards
 American Council of Learned Societies, 1975.
 1988 and 1999 Grant Awards: National Endowment for the Arts Creative Writing Fellowships in poetry.
 Rockefeller Bellagio Residency, May–June, 1993.

Works
Poetry
 The Georgics. Black Sparrow. 1968.
 Landed Natures. Black Sparrow. 1969. Poems for Self-Therapy. Perishable Press. 1972.
 
 Voluntaries. Corycian Press Iowa City. 1984.
 
 Nashvillanelle & Other Rimes. Backwoods Broadsides Chaplets #16. 1996.
 
 

Translations
  Euripides' "Cyclops," in The Tenth Muse: Classical Drama in Translation, ed. Charles Doria (Chicago/ Athens, Ohio: Swallow Press/ Ohio University Press, 1980), pp. 175–212.
  Philodemos, His Twenty-nine Extant Poems Translated into Contemporary American (Mount Horeb, Wisconsin: 1983).
  William Langland, "Piers Plowman, The C Version," a verse translation (Philadelphia: University of Pennsylvania Press, 1996). .
  Euripides' "Rhesus," in "Euripides,3," Penn Greek Drama Series, ed. David R. Slavitt and Palmer Bovie (Philadelphia: University of Pennsylvania Press, 1998), pp. 312–61. .
  I've Gazed So Much, poems by C. P. Cavafy (London: Stop Press, 2001). .
  Acts of Love, Ancient Greek Poetry from Aphrodite's Garden (New York: The Modern Library, Random House: 2006). .
  Half an Hour & Other Poems'', C. P. Cavafy (London: Stop Press, 2008). .

Editor

Anthologies

Criticism
 "George Economou on C.P. Cavafy Translations", Nomadics, May 10th, 2009

References

External links
 "George Economou readings", Penn Sound
 George Economou Papers at the Rare Book and Manuscript Library, Columbia University, New York, NY

1934 births
Columbia Graduate School of Arts and Sciences alumni
American male poets
Greek–English translators
American people of Greek descent
2019 deaths
20th-century translators